William Max McGee (July 16, 1932 – October 20, 2007) was a professional football player, a wide receiver and punter for the Green Bay Packers in the National Football League (NFL). He played from 1954 to 1967, and is best known for his seven receptions for 138 yards and two touchdowns, scoring the first touchdown, in the first Super Bowl in 1967.

Early life
McGee played high school football in White Oak, Texas, and was the first player in high-school football history ever to rush for over 3,000 yards in a single season. He rushed for 3,048 his senior year as a White Oak Roughneck in 1949.

McGee played college football at Tulane University in New Orleans, where he was a fullback and a top punter. At the time, Tulane was a member of the Southeastern Conference.

Professional career
McGee was selected in the fifth round (51st overall) of the 1954 NFL draft by the Packers. He was the punter during the first few years of his career. In his rookie season in 1954, McGee led the NFL in punting yards while catching 36 passes for 614 yards and nine touchdowns. He missed the next two seasons (1955 and 1956) to serve as a pilot in the U.S. Air Force, but returned to become the Packers' leading receiver from 1958 to 1962. McGee was one of the few bright spots on the 1958 team, which finished the season with a league-low 1-10-1 record, the worst in Packers history. During 1958, he led the NFL in yards per catch average (23.2), punting yards (2,716), and net yards average (36.0).

After Vince Lombardi took over as head coach in January 1959, McGee may be best known for his performance during the first Super Bowl game. He helped the team to six NFL championship appearances, five NFL championship wins, and two Super Bowl titles during the remaining years of his career. He was a Pro Bowl selection during the  season.

Despite reductions in playing time due to injuries and age, McGee's final two seasons were the ones for which his career is best remembered. In the 1966 season, McGee caught only four passes for 91 yards and a touchdown as the Packers recorded a 12–2 record and advanced to Super Bowl I against the Kansas City Chiefs. McGee did not expect to play in the game, and he violated his team's curfew policy and spent the night before the Super Bowl out on the town. The next morning, he told starting receiver Boyd Dowler, "I hope you don't get hurt. I'm not in very good shape," alluding to his hangover. Dowler went down with a separated shoulder on the Packers' second drive of the game, and McGee, who had to borrow a teammate's helmet because he had not brought his own out of the locker room, was put into the game. A few plays later, McGee made a one-handed reception of a pass from Bart Starr, took off past Chiefs defender Fred Williamson, and ran 37 yards to score the first touchdown in Super Bowl history.  This was a repeat of his performance in the NFL championship game two weeks earlier, when he had also caught a touchdown pass after relieving an injured Dowler.  By the end of the game, McGee had recorded seven receptions for 138 yards and two touchdowns, in a 35-10 Packers' victory.

The following year, he recorded a 35-yard reception in the third quarter of Super Bowl II that set up a touchdown in the Packers' 33–14 win over the Oakland Raiders. McGee retired shortly after the game and finished his 12-season career with 345 receptions for 6,346 yards and 12 carries for 121 yards. He scored 51 touchdowns (50 receiving and one fumble recovery). On special teams, he punted 256 times for 10,647 yards, an average of 41.6 yards per punt, and returned four kickoffs for 69 yards.

Career as a celebrity restaurateur
McGee entered into a restaurant partnership with Packer left guard Fuzzy Thurston; they operated the Left Guard Charcoal Houses in Appleton, Fond du Lac, Madison, Green Bay, and Eau Claire. They also operated the Left Guard Steak Houses in Menasha, Milwaukee, and Minneapolis–St. Paul, and the Left End Steak House in Manitowoc. In addition, McGee co-founded the Mexican restaurant chain Chi-Chi's.

Life after the NFL
After retiring from football, McGee became a major partner in developing the popular Chi-Chi's chain of Mexican restaurants with restaurateur Marno McDermott.

McGee was inducted into the Green Bay Packers Hall of Fame in 1975. His ties to the Packers continued from 1979 to 1998 when he served as the color commentator for radio broadcasts of Packers' football games. With droll wit and keen insights, McGee was extremely popular as a color commentator.

McGee founded the Max McGee National Research Center for Juvenile Diabetes in 1999 at the Children's Hospital of Wisconsin. He raised money for diabetes research.

Cancer
McGee was diagnosed with colon cancer at age 56 in April 1989, but it was caught early and he recovered after surgery.

Death
In 2007, at the age of 75, McGee died after a fall at his home in Minnetonka Beach, Minnesota, a suburb west of Minneapolis. His wife said he had been suffering from an early form of Alzheimer's disease for the previous five years.

See also
 List of NCAA major college yearly punt and kickoff return leaders

References

External links
 
 
 Sports Illustrated – cover – January 23, 1967
 Louisiana Sports Hall of Fame – Max McGee
 

1932 births
2007 deaths
Accidental deaths from falls
Accidental deaths in Minnesota
American football wide receivers
Green Bay Packers announcers
Green Bay Packers players
National Football League announcers
People from Hennepin County, Minnesota
People from Overton, Texas
Players of American football from Texas
Tulane Green Wave football players
United States Air Force officers
Western Conference Pro Bowl players
Military personnel from Texas
Military personnel from Minnesota